Hyundai Senior High School is a private high school located in Apgujeong-dong, Gangnam-gu, Seoul, South Korea.
The school was established by Hyundai Group (현대그룹), and the founder is Chung Ju-yung (정주영).
The school acquired establishment permission on April 29, 1978, and opened in 1985.

History 
 1978, April 29 - An educational foundation Seoul Hyundai Institute was established.
 1978, April 29 - The first chief director of the foundation Chung Ju-yung was inaugurated.
 1984, March 15 - The school acquired an establishment permission and started construction.
 1984, June 25 - The third chief director of the foundation Choi Su-Il was inaugurated.
 1985, January 16 - The fourth chief director of the foundation Jang Jung-Ja was inaugurated.
 1985, March 4 - The school had an entrance ceremony. The first principal Jung Hee-Kyung was inaugurated.
 1985, May 3 - The school celebrated the first school anniversary.
 1988, February 12 - The first Graduation
 2003, October 27 - Information Education Center in the school was opened.
 2011, March 2 - The school converted to an autonomous private school(자율형 사립고등학교).

Notable alumni

Choi Si-won 
Heo Young-saeng 
Lee Eun-gyeol 
Lee Joo-heon 
Lee Jung-jae 
Lee Min-jung 
Noh Hong-chul
Park Chan-yeol
Kim Dongyun

See also
Education in South Korea

External links
Hyudnai Senior High School Official Website 
Hyundai Senior High School alumni association Website 

Education in Seoul
High schools in South Korea
Educational institutions established in 1985
Hyundai Motor Group
1985 establishments in South Korea